Mark of Kalt was the canon of the Basilica of the Assumption of the Blessed Virgin Mary and chronicler of King Louis I of Hungary, known for his work Chronicon Pictum, beginning its composition in 1358 and finishing it between 1370 and 1373. He likely died while working, because contemporary sources stopped mentioning him.

He was born a member of the lower nobility in Veszprém County, and became a Franciscan friar. From 1336 to 1337 he was court priest and chaplain of the queen and from 1342 to 1352 he was parish priest in the Saint Peter temple. In 1352, he was guard in the royal chapel, and minor canon in Veszprém and Székesfehérvár. Between 1353 and 1354 he was provost of Kő, and in 1355 he became canon in Székesfehérvár. While writing the Chronicon Pictum, Mark either retired or died suddenly. The last illuminations were finished between 1370 and 1373.

References

Canons (priests)
14th-century Hungarian Roman Catholic priests
Franciscan writers
Hungarian Franciscans
Hungarian chroniclers